Blastobasis indigesta is a moth in the family Blastobasidae. It is found in Zimbabwe.

The length of the forewings is 7–7.9 mm. The forewings are brownish grey tipped with white and intermixed with white scales. The hindwings are pale brown.

References

Endemic fauna of Zimbabwe
Moths described in 1931
Blastobasis
Lepidoptera of Zimbabwe
Moths of Sub-Saharan Africa